Hasan Çetinkaya (born 27 January 1977) is a Swedish former footballer who played as a midfielder. He works today as a sports agent and the CEO of HCM Sports, representing among others Frenkie de Jong, Ramy Bensebaini, Denis Zakaria, Donny van de Beek, Noa Lang, Justin Bijlow, Emil Forsberg, Péter Gulácsi, Martin Braithwaite and Victor Lindelöf.

Clients
• Frenkie de Jong, Barcelona

• Ramy Bensebaini, Borussia Mönchengladbach

• Denis Zakaria, Chelsea

• Donny van de Beek, Manchester United

• Noa Lang, Brügge

• Victor Lindelöf, Manchester United

• Justin Bijlow, Feyenoord

• Emil Forsberg, RB Leipzig

• Jordan Teze, PSV Eindhoven

• Mohamed Daramy, Copenhagen

• Péter Gulácsi, RB Leipzig

• Armando Obispo, PSV Eindhoven

• Martin Braithwaite, Espanyol

• Hannes Wolf, Borussia Mönchengladbach

• Jordan Larsson, Copenhagen

• Stijn Spierings, Toulouse

• Ludwig Augustinsson, Mallorca

• Amin Sarr, Olympique Lyonnais

• Doğucan Haspolat, Trabzonspor

• Ken Sema, Watford

• Bart Nieuwkoop, Royale Union Saint-Gilloise

• Bilal Hussein, AIK

• Jens Stryger Larsen, Trabzonspor

• Andreas Maxsö, Colorado Rapids

• Robin Olsen, Aston Villa

• Anders Christiansen, Malmö

• Sebastian Nanasi, Malmö

• Victor Edvarsen, Djurgårdens

• Marouan Azarkan, Excelsior

• Lasse Berg Johnsen, Randers

• Mayckel Lahdo, AZ Alkmaar

• John Guidetti, AIK

• Muamer Tankovic, Pafos

• Mats Seuntjens, Waalwijk

• Felix Beijmo, Aarhus

• Patrick Carlgren, Randers

• Kristoffer Peterson, Fortuna Düsseldorf

• Ifeanyi Mathew

• Ibrahim Drešević, Fatih Karagümrük

• Franz Brorsson, Aris Limassol

• Simon Skrabb, Kalmar

• Kian Fitz-Jim, Ajax

• Ismael Diawara, Malmö

• Nabil Bahoui

• Nicolai Jørgensen

• Loret Sadiku, Hammarby

• Gustav Berggren, Raków Częstochowa

• Marcus Rohdén, Frosinone

• Yusuf Barası, AZ Alkmaar

• Isac Lidberg, Go Ahead Eagles

• Eric Larsson, OFI Crete

• Kristoffer Nordfelt, AIK

• Astrit Selmani, Midtjylland

• Mattias Johansson, Legia Warsaw

• Hugo Andersson, Randers

• Niklas Hult, Elfsborg

• Alper Demirol, Hammarby

• Ibrahim El Kadiri, Volendam

• Achraf El Bouchataoui, Deinze

• Johan Dahlin, Malmö

• Martin Olsson, Malmö

• Ömer Bayram, Eyüpspor

• Peter Gwargis, Malmö

• Mike van Beijnen, Fortuna Sittard

• Daniel Larsson

• Marcus Olsson, Halmstads

• Mikael Lustig

• Rasmus Bengtsson

References

Sources
 Finnish Veikkausliiga statistics

External links
 
 Hasan Cetinkaya photos

Living people
1977 births
Swedish footballers
IF Sylvia players
IFK Norrköping players
FC Jazz players
Landskrona BoIS players
Assyriska FF players
Jönköpings Södra IF players
Trelleborgs FF players
Allsvenskan players
Veikkausliiga players
Superettan players
Swedish expatriate footballers
Expatriate footballers in Finland
Association football agents
Swedish people of Turkish descent
Association football midfielders